Nelson Torno (10 November 1927 – 4 January 2015) was an Argentine sports shooter. He competed at the 1968 Summer Olympics and the 1972 Summer Olympics.

References

1927 births
2015 deaths
Argentine male sport shooters
Olympic shooters of Argentina
Shooters at the 1968 Summer Olympics
Shooters at the 1972 Summer Olympics
Sportspeople from Buenos Aires